Ozyorsk or Ozersk is the name of several inhabited localities in Russia.

Urban localities
Ozyorsk, Chelyabinsk Oblast, a town in Chelyabinsk Oblast
Ozyorsk, Kaliningrad Oblast, a town in Ozyorsky District of Kaliningrad Oblast

Rural localities
Ozersk, Samara Oblast, a settlement in Bolsheglushitsky District of Samara Oblast